Giorgio Berrugi is an Italian operatic tenor.

Musical education

Born in Pisa, Italy, Berrugi was a clarinetist, graduating summa cum laude from the Istituto “Mascagni” of Livorno. Further studies at the Accademia teatro alla scala (course for professional orchestral musicians), the Accademia di Imola for chamber music, and the Scuola di Musica di Fiesole, where he was awarded the Premio Lucchesini.  Berrugi was winner of several international prizes both as a solo clarinetist and as a member of the Alban Berg Duo, including first prizes at the Rome(2002) and Bologna international chamber music competitions.  In 2002 he won the Solo Clarinet chair of the Orchestra Sinfonica di Roma, which he held until 2006.

Vocal education

In 2007 Berrugi started private vocal instruction with La Scala baritone Carlo Meliciani. He made his operatic debut at the Venice Teatro La Fenice as Rodolfo in La bohème in 2008. Further vocal studies followed with Francisco Araiza and with pianist Eytan Pessen, with whom he has also performed a recital at the Ian Rosenblatt Recital Series at Wigmore Hall.

Career

In 2010 Giorgio Berrugi was invited by opera director Eytan Pessen to the ensemble of the Dresden Semperoper where he stayed until 2013; with that company he debuted roles including Don José in Carmen, Riccardo in Un ballo in maschera, Mario Cavaradossi in Tosca, Nemorino in L’elisir d’amore, Duca di Mantova in Rigoletto, and Gennarino in the world première of Hans Werner Henze‘s Gisela!.

Berrugi's Dresden years propelled him to an international career. Since 2013 Berrugi has performed in opera theatres and festivals all over the world. In Italy he has performed at the Teatro La Scala (Verdi Requiem and Simon Boccanegra), the Teatro Massimo di Palermo (Rodolfo, Edgardo), the Teatro Regio (Turin) (Tamino, Rodolfo, Edgardo), the Teatro Verdi di Salerno (Rodolfo), the Arena di Verona Festival (Roméo, Pinkerton, Ismaele in Nabucco),the Teatro di San Carlo (Nemorino, Rodolfo in Luisa Miller), the Teatro Municipale di Piacenza (Hoffmann). Berrugi also performs frequently with the Italian soprano Maria Agresta.

International appearances include the San Francisco Opera (Rodolfo), the Deutsche Oper Berlin (Rodolfo),  the Opéra de Marseille (Cavaradossi),  Oviedo (Rodolfo), Lucerne (Verdi Requiem), the Théâtre des Champs-Élysées (Verdi Requiem), the Gewandhaus, Suntory Hall, Japan, Wigmore Hall, London, the Concertgebouw in Amsterdam, (Cavaradossi), and the Savonlinna Opera Festival (Pinkerton).

Conductors
Berrugi has collaborated with prominent conductors including Zubin Mehta, Daniel Oren, Christian Thielemann, Fabio Luisi, Gustavo Dudamel, Pinchas Steinberg, Nicola Luisotti, Myung-whun Chung, and Jaap van Zweden.

Vocal and artistic characteristics
Mentioned by Placido Domingo as one of his vocal successors, Berrugi’s voice has been described as a tenor of radiant, honeyed color, "clear bright tone" and typically Italianate timbre, contributing to his association with the tenor roles of Puccini and Verdi, but he has performed numerous French roles and sings a varied repertoire including modern works by Henze and others.

Personal life
Giorgio Berrugi is married and has a son.

Repertoire

Operatic Roles

Concert Repertoire

References

External links

Ieri Oggi Domani Opera (in Italian)
 Youtube performance as clarinettist
Youtube link Arena di Verona, Pinkerton
 Youtube link Deutsche Oper Berlin, Rodolfo
 Youtube linke La SCALA, Duca, Rigoletto
 Youtube linke,  Dresden Semperoper, Nemorino
Youtube link, Respighi, Nebbie (with pianist Eytan Pessen)
Youtube Link, Ladino song, Al Deredor (with pianist Eytan Pessen)
with Giorgio Beruggi (Liricamente, in Italian)
 Interview La Nueve Spagna (in Spanish)
 Operatic performance schedule on Operabase

Living people
1975 births
Italian operatic tenors
People from Pisa
Performing arts pages with videographic documentation
20th-century Italian male  opera singers
21st-century Italian male  opera singers